The Arbitration is a 2016 Nigerian romantic drama film, written by Chinaza Onuzo, directed by Niyi Akinmolayan, and produced by Chinaza Onuzo, Omotayo Adeola, and Zulu Oyibo. The film stars OC Ukeje, Adesua Etomi, Iretiola Doyle and Somkele Iyamah-Idhalama.

Plot
Gbenga (OC Ukeje), is a charming entrepreneur, running a very profitable tech company, and is the defendant in a law suit filed by Dara (Adesua Etomi), a computer engineer, whose talent helped Gbenga's company acquire the height it's reached. Both colleagues were lovers whose relationship ended when Gbenga discovered his wife (Beverly Naya) was pregnant with their supposed-to-be first child. Her lawsuit seeks compensation for those accounts, and Dara sues Gbenga for coercing her into sex (which counts as rape).

Cast
 OC Ukeje as Mr. Gbenga
 Adesua Etomi as Dara
 Somkele Iyamah-Idhalama as Omawumi Horsfall
 Iretiola Doyle as Funlaya Johnson

Production
Shooting of the film took place at locations in Lagos.

Release
The film  was released in Nigerian cinemas on 12 August 2016. It also premiered at the Toronto International Film Festival.

References

External links
 

Nigerian romantic drama films
2016 films
Films directed by Niyi Akinmolayan
2010s English-language films
English-language Nigerian films